The following Wikipedia articles deal with 20th-century music.

Western art music

Main articles
20th-century classical music
Contemporary classical music, covering the period

Sub-topics
Aleatoric music
Electronic music
Experimental music
Expressionist music
Microtonal music
Minimal music
Modernism (music)
Neoclassical music
Modern opera
Twelve-tone technique (dodecaphonic music)

Folk music
Bluegrass music
Contemporary folk music
Roots revival
World music

Popular music

Main article
Popular music

African popular music
African popular music

Popular music in Asia

India
Indian pop

Japan
Japanese popular music

Popular music in Latin America
Music of Latin America

See also
Sound recording and reproduction

 
music
Contemporary music
Rock music